Mapua, Māpua, or Mapúa may refer to:
Mapuá River, a river in the Pará state of north-central Brazil
Māpua, New Zealand, a small town on the South Island of New Zealand
Mapúa University, a tertiary institute in Manila, Philippines
Tomás Mapúa, the first registered Filipino architect